BBC Choice was a British digital television channel which was owned by the BBC and was launched on 23 September 1998. It was the first British TV channel to broadcast exclusively in digital format, as well as the BBC's second non-analogue-terrestrial channel launch (following on from the BBC News channel in 1997).

At launch, BBC Choice mainly existed to supplement existing programming on BBC One and Two, with some low-profile original programming of its own. However, faced with low ratings for both Choice and BBC Knowledge, in 2000 the BBC's digital strategy changed. Under new controller Stuart Murphy, the channel began to aim specifically at a young adult audience. The BBC ultimately planned to replace the channel with the higher-profile BBC Three, which, after some delay, began broadcasting in February 2003.

History

Launch

When BBC Choice launched, no digital TV receivers were available to the general public as Sky Digital and ONdigital had not yet launched. Instead, the launch programme was broadcast over the internet, with the first day's schedule including a Tomorrow's World guide to digital television and repeats of the very first episodes of EastEnders and Monty Python's Flying Circus.

The main format of the channel was a mix of BBC One and Two programming as well as original programming such as Backstage, broadcast live each weeknight, which took viewers behind the scenes of different parts of the BBC. The channel also provided exclusive coverage of music festivals such as Glastonbury and extended live coverage of sport, for when either BBC One or Two have to end their coverage early or their schedules are unable to provide live sport action.

BBC Choice also introduced an innovative programme format known as 'Hotlink', which expanded on popular shows. Examples included Watchdog Extra, where viewers could contact the show by phone or e-mail with either questions or feedback on the issues discussed. Crimewatch Extra provided follow-up detail on the cases involved in the main programme, and Row Z was a football discussion forum that aired after Match of the Day finished on BBC One. The 'Hotlink' format has since been adopted by many other channels, particularly both ITV2 and E4.

BBC Choice initially broadcast from 5pm daily; this later switched to 7pm. The 7pm start carried over into its successor BBC Three.

Children's programming
BBC Choice also aired children's programmes; this duty transferred to CBBC Channel and CBeebies when they launched on 11 February 2002.

For the first year of BBC Choice, children's programming would air on weekend afternoons as CBBC Choice, and included strands like 'Dog & Dinosaur', 'The Crew Room', 'L&K Replay' and 'Re:Peter'. From 29 November 1999, this was supplanted with a daily CBBC on Choice strand, running from 6am to 7pm every day, for programmes aimed at pre-school children, with presentation links pre-recorded by a CBBC presenter. It included repeats of archive shows rarely seen on the main channels, such as Mr Benn, Paddington, Simon and the Witch, Ivor the Engine, Jonny Briggs, Pigeon Street,  and Bitsa.  This continued until February 2002, when the CBBC and CBeebies channels launched, with the CBBC Channel taking up BBC Choice's daytime broadcast bandwidth, but occupying a separate EPG position.

Post-2000 refresh
In June 2000, the BBC radically changed its digital channel formats. The initial format had seen BBC Choice target a similar mixed audience to BBC One and Two with a general entertainment skew, with BBC Knowledge focusing on educational and informative programming. From 2000 both Knowledge and Choice became targeted to more specific audiences, with Knowledge moving to a broader documentary and culture mix and Choice focusing on developing a stronger relationship with the young adult audience, which historically the BBC had difficulty reaching. BBC Choice abandoned many of its original programmes such as Backstage, and aimed at younger people, with most of the early part of the schedules being made up of fifteen-minute programmes under the banner of "Refreshing TV" or "Micro TV". Entertainment news magazine Liquid News, presented by Christopher Price, evolved out of News 24's Zero 30 and became the channel's flagship show.

Announcement of the end of BBC Choice
In August 2000, the BBC announced that it would replace BBC Choice as soon as possible with BBC Three, which would be a continuation of the "youth" aspect of the new BBC Choice. But the government delayed approving the relaunch, which formed part of wider plans to reshape the BBC's digital provision, plans which also included the proposed BBC Four, two children's channels and five digital radio stations. Whilst BBC Three was delayed, the other proposals gained the approval of Parliament and the new channels went on air in 2002, meaning BBC Four launched prior to BBC Three. From October 2001, BBC Choice began screening a significant amount of new, young-skewing programming, the kind of content that had been earmarked for BBC Three.

The BBC submitted a revised proposal for the new channel raised the target age range to 25–34 and increased the amount of factual and arts programming, with a nightly 15-minute news programme – it was hoped these changes would better illustrate how BBC Three would differ from rivals such as E4, ITV2 and Sky One. This new proposal for BBC Three was given the go-ahead in September 2002, with a set of public-service conditions laid down and a launch date of February 2003 set. The final night of BBC Choice was given over entirely to previews of the new channel.

Programming
Initially, the main attractions of BBC Choice were multi-broadcast TV shows, with the option to choose which programme you viewed. The first broadcast by the BBC with this option was two months after the launch of the channel, showing Stressed Eric, with Naked Video as the Digital Teletext option. In addition, BBC Choice also aired new episodes of some series, such as Robot Wars, before their first broadcast on the terrestrial BBC channels.

Its single-show programming was mainly concerned with celebrities, including documentary profiles and the nightly entertainment magazine Liquid News. EastEnders Revealed was the only show from the original 1998 channel lineup to survive and outlive the entire life of the channel itself, transferring to its successor, BBC Three.

Regional variations
BBC Choice had regional variations for Wales, Scotland and Northern Ireland which were broadcast in place of the network BBC Choice service in their respective areas from 10:30pm (following the EastEnders replay) to circa midnight nightly. At the time the BBC's digital offering included the national variants of BBC One (England, Scotland, Wales, NI) and a single nationwide BBC Two.

The regional variations of Choice were discontinued in 2001 in favour of introducing regional opt-outs on BBC Two to digital services; in some cases, such as BBC 2W in Wales, analogue and digital versions of BBC Two were separately scheduled, but by 2010 all differences between the analogue and digital variants of BBC Two had ceased, and there is now one version of the channel in each area, broadcasting on analogue (until switchoff) and digital platforms. The English regional variants of BBC One were made available digitally from 2003.

Since the cessation of the BBC Choice splits, all BBC digital TV channels (including Choice's successor BBC Three) have operated as UK-wide services with no regional opt-out functionality.

References

Television channels and stations established in 1998
Television channels and stations disestablished in 2003
1998 establishments in the United Kingdom
2003 disestablishments in the United Kingdom
Defunct BBC television channels